Umm al-Kitab is an Islam-related term that may refer to:

  (Shi'i book), a syncretic Shi'i work originating in  circles and preserved in the Isma'ili tradition
 Heavenly Quran, known in Arabic as